Rotherwas Chapel is a family chapel, once belonging to the Bodenham family. It is now state-owned and administered by English Heritage. The chapel contains structures from medieval, Elizabethan, Georgian and Victorian periods. The originally simple medieval building has a fine Elizabethan timber roof, a rebuilt 18th century tower, and striking Victorian interior decoration with furnishings by the Pugins.

It is located near Hereford, Herefordshire, England and maintained by English Heritage.

External links

Rotherwas Chapel, English Heritage

English Heritage sites in Herefordshire